Ben Ishola (born June 8, 1980) is a German former professional gridiron football defensive end. He most recently played for the Toronto Argonauts of the Canadian Football League. He was signed by the Miami Dolphins as an undrafted free agent in 2006. He played college football at Indiana.

Ishola was born in Berlin, Germany; his father is Nigerian.

Ishola was also a member of the Hamburg Sea Devils, Indianapolis Colts, Montreal Alouettes, and the Cincinnati Bengals.

References

External links
Indiana Hoosiers bio
Indianapolis Colts bio
Montreal Alouettes bio
Toronto Argonauts bio

1980 births
Living people
Sportspeople from Berlin
American football defensive ends
Canadian football defensive linemen
American players of Canadian football
Indiana Hoosiers football players
Miami Dolphins players
Hamburg Sea Devils players
Indianapolis Colts players
Montreal Alouettes players
Cincinnati Bengals players
Toronto Argonauts players
German players of American football
German sportspeople of Nigerian descent